Duel of Fists (Quan Ji or Kuen gik) is a 1971 Hong Kong martial arts film directed by Chang Cheh and starring David Chiang and Ti Lung. Filmed on location in Bangkok, the story concerns a Hong Kong engineer (Chiang) who goes to Thailand to find his long-lost half-brother (Ti Lung), who is a Muay Thai boxer.

Plot
Fan Ko, an engineering architect in Hong Kong who is also highly skilled in martial arts, is called to the bedside of his dying father, who reveals that he long ago had an affair with a woman in Thailand, who bore him a son. He begs Fan Ko to go to Thailand and find the young man, and shows him an old photo, taken when the brother was perhaps 10 years old. But even then, the fierce-looking boy was training in the Thai martial art, Muay Thai, and sported a tattoo on his left arm of a ship's anchor and a swallow flying underneath.

So Fan Ko catches a Cathay Pacific flight to Bangkok Airport and is met by a family friend and booked into a room at the Dusit Thani Hotel. Leaving behind the suit-and-tie of his job, he's dressed in the colorful fashions of the day.

At that moment in Thailand, it is Songkran, the Thai new year, when revelers splash water on each other.

However, at Lumphini Boxing Stadium, the atmosphere is decidedly less festive, as another young boxer has been killed in the ring by the current champion, Cannon, who is backed by the local Triad boss and a crooked fight promoter, Qiang-ren. Using tactics of intimidation and with crooked officials on their payroll, the mob keeps supplying fighters to face the brutal Cannon. Among them is Wenlie, who needs to raise money to pay for an operation for his sick mother, despite the objections of his girlfriend, Yulan.

Fan Ko, meanwhile, is nosing around at Lumpini stadium, and thinks that a fighter named Miller may be his brother after he sees a large plywood cutout of the boxer and notices the anchor-and-bird tattoo. He asks a bystander, an old fighter-turned-alcoholic, what the man's name is. "People call him 'dead man'," the old drunk says, because he's the next to face Cannon.

When Miller faces Cannon, Fan Ko tries in vain to stop the fight, and Miller is pummeled – another fighter killed in the ring. Fan Ko checks the tattoo. It's a ship's anchor alright, but the bird flying underneath is an eagle. Miller was not his brother.

By now Fan Ko has become acquainted with a young Thai woman named Mei-dai, who shows him more sights around Bangkok, including the Grand Palace. And, through his investigation around Lumpini stadium, he's met Wenlie, but he's not seen Wenlie's left arm.

Then Wenlie gets in the ring against Cannon. Fan Ko is watching the fight and sees the tattoo on Wenlie's arm – it's a ship's anchor with a swallow underneath. Wenlie is Fan Ko's brother. The fight against Cannon is a tough one, but Wenlie is a strong fighter and he comes back from a savage beating to win. Fan Ko runs up to the ringside and tells Wenlie that they are brothers.

Miller's brother Misao kills Cannon after the match, incurring the wrath of the villains. They storm Wenlie's place when he is not at home and kidnap Misao. When the brothers are ambushed, the two brothers are formidable and beat down the thugs and the main stooge. He tells them that they have kidnapped Misao, so the two brothers go to fetch him.

At the house, Misao is beaten and killed, and the two  brothers face off against a large group of weapon wielding henchmen. Fan Ko takes on the goons while Wenlie faces Qiang-ren. When a henchman cuts Wenlie's arm, Fan Ke disembowels the man with his skills and the henchmen run off. Fan Ko takes on Qiang-ren and breaks the villain's leg, and the police arrive to arrest the villain.

Cast
David Chiang as Fan Ko
Ti Lung as Wenile
Ching Miao as Dying father
Ku Feng as Cannon
Ching Li as Yulan
Pawana Chanachit (Lau Lan Ying) as Mei-Dai
Wang Chung as Misao
Chan Sing as Qiang-ren
Woo Wai as Xu Qiu
Canong Daech as Miller
Yueng Chi-hing as Old drunken fighter

References

External links
Review at KungFuCinema.com
Review at LoveHKfilm.com

1971 films
1971 martial arts films
Shaw Brothers Studio films
Triad films
Hong Kong action films
Hong Kong martial arts films
1971 action films
Films directed by Chang Cheh
Kung fu films
Muay Thai films
1970s Hong Kong films